AP-2 complex subunit beta is a protein that in humans is encoded by the AP2B1 gene.

Function 

The protein encoded by this gene is one of two large chain components of the AP2 adaptor complex, which serves to link clathrin to receptors in coated vesicles. The encoded protein is found on the cytoplasmic face of coated vesicles in the plasma membrane. Two transcript variants encoding different isoforms have been found for this gene.

Interactions 

AP2B1 has been shown to interact with:

 AP1M2, 
 Arrestin beta 2,
 BUB1B, 
 LDLRAP1  and
 TGF beta receptor 2.

References

Further reading

External links